Crapo Park (85 acres, 34 hectares) is a city park with arboretum and botanical garden, alongside the Mississippi River at Parkway Drive, Burlington, Iowa. Those who are not familiar with the park often mispronounce it as "crap-oh" Park, with the correct pronunciation being Park. 

It is reputed to be the site where the American flag was first raised on Iowa's soil, by Zebulon Pike in 1805.

The park includes an arboretum containing more than 200 varieties of trees and shrubs, as well as botanical gardens of annuals and perennials. As of 2003, the following park trees were on Iowa's statewide "Big Tree" list: Arizona cypress (Cupressus arizonica), black hickory (Carya glabra), pawpaw (Asimina triloba), and black walnut (Juglans nigra).

Background
The park was established in 1895 by Philip Crapo, a local businessman and philanthropist, in time for the Iowa semi-centennial (1896), with landscape engineering by Earnshaw and Punshon of Cincinnati, Ohio. The park includes walking paths and four shelters, as well as Lake Starker (constructed 1905, 0.6 hectares), the Hawkeye Natives Log Cabin (replica constructed 1910), Zebulon Pike Memorial, and Foehlinger Fountain. It also includes the Black Hawk Spring and Cave, commemorating Chief Black Hawk. One can crawl for more than a hundred feet through a rock tube before the passage gets too small. A cold spring runs through the cave as well. The neighboring Dankwardt Park is popular with frisbee-golf enthusiasts.

One of the primary downsides of the park is the narrow roads that wind through it, the road width, and the brick drainages on either side, which taper rather sharply, can sometimes be a hazard, especially when a driver gets his tires stuck in the drainages.

The park was added to the National Register of Historic Places in 1976.

In 2007, Main Street was blocked off while crews attempted to repair or replace the aging 150-year-old Cascade Bridge, which leads to the park; As of November, 2020, the bridge remains closed.

See also 
 List of botanical gardens in the United States

References

Arboreta in Iowa
Botanical gardens in Iowa
National Register of Historic Places in Des Moines County, Iowa
Protected areas of Des Moines County, Iowa
Burlington, Iowa
Parks in Iowa
Historic districts on the National Register of Historic Places in Iowa
Historic districts in Des Moines County, Iowa
Parks on the National Register of Historic Places in Iowa